Marcos Baghdatis was the defending champion, but chose to participate in the Kremlin Cup instead.
Roger Federer won this event, by defeating Florian Mayer 6–4, 6–3 in the final.

Seeds
The top four seeds received a bye into the second round.

Draw

Finals

Top half

Bottom half

References
 Main draw
 Qualifying draw

If Stockholm Open - Singles
2010 Stockholm Open